Katsuragi Ace (24 April 1980 – 3 July 2000) was a Japanese Thoroughbred racehorse best known for winning the 1984 Japan Cup, becoming the first Japanese-trained horse to win the race. He won twice as a two-year-old and three times in the following year, but was well beaten by his contemporary Mr. C.B. in all three legs of the Japanese Triple Crown. In the first half of 1984 he won the Grade II Sankei Osaka Hai the Grade III Keihan Hei and the Grade I Takarazuka Kinen. In the autumn of 1984 he defeated Mr C B in the Grade II Mainichi Okan and overcame a top-class international field to win the Japan Cup. He was retired to stud in 1985 but had little success as a breeding stallion. He died in 2000 at the age of twenty.

Background
Katsuragi Ace was a dark bay or brown horse with a white star and snip bred in Japan by Sentaro Katayama. His sire was Boysie Boy, an Irish-bred colt who raced in Europe and produced his best performance when finishing second to Habitat in the 1969 Prix du Moulin. He later stood as a breeding stallion in Australia and Japan. Katsuragi Ace's dam Tanino Venture was a Japanese-bred daughter of the British stallion Venture, whose wins included the Middle Park Stakes, St James's Palace Stakes and Sussex Stakes. Tanino Venture was descended from the influential British broodmare Polly Flinders. During his racing career Katsuragi Ace was trained by Kazumi Domon. He was ridden in all of his early race by Hiroki Sakiyama.

Racing career

1982: two-year-old season
Katsuragi Ace made a successful racecourse debut by winning a maiden race over 1200 metres at Hanshin Racecourse on 19 September. After finishing second to Mejiro Mont Cenis over 1400 metres at the same track on 3 October he won the Rindo Tokubetsu over 1200 metres at Kyoto Racecourse two weeks later. On his final appearance of the year he finished third to Mejiro Mont Cenis over 1600 metres on 27 November.

1983: three-year-old season
Katsuragi Ace began his second season by finishing unplaced over 1600 metres at Kyoto in February and then won the Shunran Sho at Hanshin in March. At Nakayama Racecourse in April he contested the Satsuki Sho (the first leg of the Japanese Triple Crown) and finished unplaced behind Mr. C.B. On 8 May he recorded his most important success up to that point when he won the NHK Hai (the forerunner of the NHK Mile Cup) over 2000 metres at Tokyo Racecourse. Three weeks later he finished sixth behind Mr C B in the Tokyo Yushun. He ended the first half of his season by finishing sixth to Nihon Pillow Winner over 1400 metres at Chukyo Racecourse on 26 June.

After a summer break, Katsuragi Ace returned on 2 October and finished second to Suzuka Koban in the Kobe Shimbun Hai at Hanshin. Katsuichi Nishiura took over from Sakiyama when the colt appeared in the Kyoto Shimbun Hai three weeks later and won from Lead Hoyu and Dokan Yashima. Nishiura rode Katsuragi Ace in all of his subsequent races. The colt ended his season by finishing unplaced behind Mr C B in the Kikuka Sho at Kyoto on 13 November.

1984: four-year-old season
In 1984 the system of Graded stakes races was introduced in Japan. On his first run as a four-year-old Katsuragi Ace finished fourth in the Naruo Kinen at Hanshin on 11 March and then won the Grade II Sankei Osaka Hai on 1 April, beating the Queen Elizabeth II Commemorative Cup winner Long Grace. On 13 May at Kyoto he defeated Sunny Ciboulette (Hanshin Futurity takes) and the mare Global Dyna to win the Grade III Keihan Hai. On his next appearance the colt was moved up to Grade I class for the Takarazuka Kinen over 2200 metres at Hanshin on 3 June. He won by one and a quarter lengths from Suzuka Koban, with Global Dyna taking third place. Three weeks later he ended his spring and summer campaign by finishing fifth in the Takamatsunomiya Cup at Chukyo Racecourse.

On 7 October Katsuragi Ace returned in the Grade II Mainichi Okan over 1800 metres at Tokyo and defeated Mr C B by a head. In the autumn edition of the Grade I Tenno Sho three weeks later he finished fifth of the fifteen runners behind Mr C B. On 25 November, in front of a crowd of 112,000 at Tokyo, Katsuragi Ace was one of fourteen horses to contest the fourth running of the Japan Cup and started a 40/1 outsider. The three previous editions of the race had been won by two horses from North America (Mairzy Doates and Half Iced) and one from Europe (Stanerra). The Japanese runners were headed by Mr C B and Symboli Rudolf meaning that the race featured the first showdown between two Triple Crown winners in Japanese racing history. The overseas challengers included Strawberry Road, Kiwi and Bounty Hawk (VRC Derby) from Australasia, Majesty's Prince from America and the British-trained gelding Bedtime. Wearing a distinctive white hood, Katsuragi Ace went to the front soon after the start and opened up a big lead, but appeared to weaken approaching the final turn and faced several challengers early in the straight. He rallied strongly in the closing stages, however, and won by one and a half lengths from Bedtime, with Symboli Rudolf in third, Majesty's Prince fourth and Mr C B unplaced.

On his final racecourse appearance, Katsuragi Ace was invited to contest the Arima Kinen at Nakayama on 23 December. He finished second to Symboli Rudolf, with Mr C B in third.

Stud record
Katsuragi Ace was retired from racing to become a breeding stallion. His only Graded Stakes winner was the mare Yamanin Marine who won the Grade II Sankei Sports Sho Yonsai Himba Tokubetsu in 1991. The stallion died of heart failure on 3 July 2000.

Pedigree

References 

1980 racehorse births
2000 racehorse deaths
Racehorses bred in Japan
Racehorses trained in Japan
Thoroughbred family 14-c
Japan Cup winners